Ernani do Nascimento Germano, better known as Ernani (São João da Barra, 16 July 1982) is a Brazilian footballer, who acts as a steering wheel and side. Currently playing for Desportiva Ferroviária.

Career
Ernani took his first steps in football Iraty, where he soon moved to the Youth, after a pass off in southern Brazil, also played for Marília and finally signed with the American team of Campos, Rio de Janeiro. Did an excellent Campeonato Carioca, Ernani received an offer of big clubs like Botafogo and Flamengo, but ended up going to Vasco da Gama, where he wears the shirt 46.

Ernani was revealed by Americano in 2004 after he was traded to the Iraty after standing out in the State in 2006. His clubs were in the youth Rio Branco, Campos, and Americano, also from Campos.

In January 2010 suffered a car accident in Rio de Janeiro, where he fractured his pelvis. The expected recovery is 3 months.

Before joining Brazilian side Vitória on 4 January 2011, he played for Vasco da Gama.

Career statistics
(Correct )

References

External links
ogol 
Ernani at Footballzz
Ernani at ZeroZero

1984 births
Living people
Brazilian footballers
CR Vasco da Gama players
Esporte Clube Vitória players
Duque de Caxias Futebol Clube players
Macaé Esporte Futebol Clube players
Association football defenders